Akrites is a municipal unit of Nestorio Municipality in Kastoria regional unit, Western Macedonia, Greece. The municipal unit has an area of 85.724 km2 with a population of 669 inhabitants according to Greek census in 2011.

Settlements 
The settlements of the municipal unit are:

 Chionato
 Dipotamia
 Kali Vrysi
 Komninades
 Mesovracho
 Polyanemo

Notable people 

 Symeon Kortsalis, Greek revolutionary from Polyanemo who participated in Greek revolution of 1821
 Christina Giazitzidou, Greek rower, originally from Chionato, who won a bronze medal at the 2012 Summer Olympics in London

External links 

 Kastoria to Dipotamia: Bouzouki evening on greekhiking.com

References

Populated places in Kastoria (regional unit)
Former municipalities in Western Macedonia